Octamoxin (trade names Ximaol, Nimaol), also known as 2-octylhydrazine, is an irreversible and nonselective monoamine oxidase inhibitor (MAOI) of the hydrazine class that was used as an antidepressant in the 1960s but is now no longer marketed.

See also
 Hydrazine (antidepressant)

References

Withdrawn drugs
Hydrazines
Monoamine oxidase inhibitors